A property cycle is a sequence of recurrent events reflected in demographic, economic and emotional factors that affect supply and demand for property subsequently influencing the property market. 

The first recorded pioneer of studying property cycles was Homer Hoyt (1895–1984) in 100 Years of Real Estate Values in Chicago (1933, reissued by Beard Books, 2000). It is widely recognised that property (along with other forms of investment) follows a predictable cycle. The property cycle has three recognised recurring phases of boom, slump, and recovery. The cycle follows a consistent pattern which can be accurately assessed by following the trends of a collective basket of Key Drivers (as outlined below).

Property cycle phases
The property cycle follows a predictable pattern. This pattern reveals three distinct phases being Boom followed by Slump followed by Recovery before the next Boom commences etc. The property cycle (unimpeded) will always follows this pattern so a Boom cannot precede another Boom without first experiencing a Slump followed by a Recovery before the next Boom can arrive. The property cycle must have a 'free market' where property ownership is attainable by citizens without, significant government restrictions on ownership or, any form of monopoly.

The following is an overview only of some of the elements evident in each of the property cycles phases.

Boom
When the Boom phase commences most people fail to believe the Boom will last and think it is just a short term anomaly because they do not have the context of understanding the property cycle.

What is observed during the Boom phase includes:
  Rents rise to levels which place significant financial pressure on tenants
  The time it takes for a property to sell after being listed for sale reduces markedly
  Property prices rise
  Yields fall as prices rise proportionally more than rents rise
  There are few mortgagee/forced sales
  Property finance is easy to obtain and there are a number of new lending products making borrowing easier
  People borrow against their increased house values and spend this money on consumer items (TVs, boats, holidays, cars, etc.)
  There are many property seminars competing for investor dollars
  Property is a hot topic in the media. Initially there is much speculation about how price growth will continue, but later in the Boom the media turns its attention to the reduced affordability of property
  There is a lot of discussion about how this Boom will never end i.e. "it is different this time" and expectations that there will be no subsequent Slump phase

Slump
The Slump phase typically commences a lengthy period of time (often years) before most people realise the property market is in the Slump phase, as there is a delay between the shifting trends of the "Key Drivers" and the impacts that are evidenced in the property market. The slump is usually the longest phase in the property cycle. The longer and bigger the preceding Boom, the longer and harder the subsequent Slump is likely to be. In contrast to popular opinion property values do not necessarily fall during a Slump, values may simply stall for a lengthy period.

What is observed during the Slump phase includes:
  Increased vacancies of rental properties
  Reduced cash flow for investors
  Property price growth stagnates and/or property values fall
  The length of time to sell a property increases markedly
  Increased number of mortgagee/forced sales
  Property finance is more difficult to obtain
  There is much "doom and gloom" about property values being too high in the media
  Many property investors experience lower cash flow and sell down their property portfolios to some degree, or completely.

Recovery
The recovery phase is always much shorter than the slump or boom phases. 

What is observed during the Recovery phase includes:
  Increased rents and cash flows
  The length of time to sell a property reduces
  Property prices begin to increase
  Much confusion in the media reigns about whether recent property value growth is sustainable
  Many potential property purchasers delay buying because they evidenced value falls or a slow market in the preceding slump.

See also
Real Estate Economics
Law of rent
Housing bubble

References

 

Real estate industry